Insidious is the 5th full-length album by Mephisto Walz. All the tracks on this album were arranged, recorded, mixed, written and produced by Barry Galvin. Christianna provided the vocals and David Glass supplied some of the drum tracks for this album (One less day). The outro Ombra mai fu was written by Georg Friedrich Händel, reagganged by Bari-Bari, while vocals were added by Diana Briscoe

Track listing
"A Magic Bag" – 4:34
"Our Flesh" – 4:04
"Watching From The Darkest Places" – 3:49
"Before These Crimes" – 4:54
"One Less Day" – 4:39
"I Want" – 4:42
"Witches Gold" – 5:05
"Memories Kill" – 3:42
"Nightingale" – 7:09
"Ombra mai fu" – 3:02

References

 Mephisto Walz Discography Info
 Booklet details in: Mephisto Walz, Insidious, CD-Album, Alice in..., 2004

2004 albums
Alice In... albums